A regent is someone appointed to administer a state in the absence, incapacity, or minority of the monarch.

Regent or The Regent may also refer to:

Arts, entertainment, and media

 The Regent, a novel by Arnold Bennett
 Regent Records (UK)
 Regent Records (US)
 Regent Releasing, a theatrical film distribution company
 Regent Theatre (disambiguation), several theatres and cinemas
 Townsquare Media, a radio broadcaster based in Cincinnati, Ohio, US formerly known as Regent Communication.

Brands and enterprises
 Regent (German brand), German handmade suits manufacturer
 Regent, a name used by Texaco in Britain from 1947 to 1967
 Regent Seven Seas Cruises, a cruise line based in Fort Lauderdale, Florida, US
Sands Regent, a casino holding company based in Reno, Nevada, US

Education

 Regent, a member of a Board of Regents
 Regent College, a Christian graduate school in Vancouver, British Columbia, Canada
 Regent College, Leicester, a form colleges in Leicester, England
 Regent House, the official governing body of the University of Cambridge, England
 Regent House Grammar School, a coeducational grammar school in Newtownards, County Down, Northern Ireland
 Regent master (Magister regens), in the medieval university 
 Regent University, a Christian university in Virginia Beach, Virginia, US
 Regent Secondary School, a government secondary school in Choa Chu Kang, Singapore

Hotels
 Regent Inns, the parent company of Walkabout and Jongleurs/Bar Risa chains
 Regent International Hotels, a luxury hotel chain
 Regent Palace Hotel, a hotel in Glasshouse Street, London, England

Places
 Regent, North Dakota, city in Hettinger County, North Dakota, US
 Regent, Sierra Leone, town in the Western Area Rural District of Sierra Leone
 Regent Centre, business park in Gosforth, near Newcastle, England, UK
 Regent Square (Pittsburgh), neighborhood in the East End area of Pittsburgh, Pennsylvania, US

Species
 Regent bowerbird, Sericulus chrysocephalus
 Regent honeyeater, Xanthomyza phrygia
 Regent parrot, Polytelis anthopeplus
 Regent whistler, Pachycephala schlegelii

Transport
Regent, a freighter from the Latvian fleet that fought for the Allies in World War II
 AEC Regent I, a double-decker bus produced by Associated Equipment Company between 1929 and 1942
 Dodge Regent, an automobile built by Chrysler Corporation of Canada
 HMS Regent, the name of three ships of the English navy or Royal Navy
 Regent Airways, a Bangladeshi airline owned by HG Aviation Ltd
 Regent railway station, a railway station in Melbourne, Victoria, Australia
 RFA Regent (A486), an ammunition, explosives, and food stores ship in the Royal Fleet Auxiliary, UK

Other uses
Philippe II, Duke of Orléans, also referred to as "the Regent"
 Regent (grape), a grape variety
 Regent (insecticide)
 Pompadour (hairstyle) or regent, a hairstyle
 Regent Diamond, a large diamond found in India in 1698, now in the Louvre Museum, France

See also
Beverly Wilshire Hotel, known as the Regent Beverly Wilshire in the 1990s
Regency (disambiguation)
 Regente Feijó, a municipality in the state of São Paulo in Brazil
 Regenten, the oligarchy that ruled the Dutch Republic
 Regents (disambiguation) (includes "Regent's")
 Regent's Park (disambiguation)